Anna und die Liebe (Anna and (the) Love) is the eleventh Telenovela made in Germany. It has aired since 25 August 2008 on German channel Sat.1 and Austrian Channel ORF 1.

Summary 
In its first season, Anna Polauke is extremely shy. In front of strange and important people, she can't utter a single word or simply starts to stutter. She works at her mother's restaurant Goldelse (Golden Elisabeth), dreaming about working at the advertising agency Broda & Broda.

Because of her impediment, her job interview ends up being a disaster. Also, she suffers from her stepfather Armin and her half-sister Katja. Armin is annoyed, because Anna still loves her missing father overall, Katja hates Anna realizing that she isn't as intelligent as Anna.

When Anna meets Jonas Broda, junior director of Broda & Broda, she just wants only one thing: To work at the advertising agency as soon as possible  and to be around Jonas.

But her halfsister Katja steals Anna's idea for a campaign for a perfume and gets a job at Broda & Broda. Anna manages to get a job as a runner at Broda & Broda - and without her creative ideas, Katja would lose her job at Broda & Broda. She wins Jonas for herself, while Anna is still seen as a talentless runner.

The first season (episode 1–311) revolved around Anna and Jonas. Jeanette Biedermann (Anna) took a break from the show, to focus on her music career, with her new album (Undress to the Beat). Due to its ratings success, Sat.1 ordered more episodes. Since its launch, the telenovela had four seasons (consecutively). Each season would focus on the protagonist (not necessarily Anna) and their "love". The second season was mainly about Mia and Alexander (episode 312–564). Third season (with Jeanette Biedermann's return to the show) centered on Anna with Tom and Enrique (episode 565–798). Fourth and final season (episode 799–926) is with Nina and Luca.

Cast

Main actors

Broadcasters

External links 
 Official Website (German)
 

2008 telenovelas
2008 German television series debuts
2012 German television series endings
German telenovelas
German-language television shows
Sat.1 telenovelas